The Freedom Road Socialist Organization (FRSO) is a Marxist–Leninist organization in the United States. It formed in 1985 amid the collapse of the Maoist-oriented New Communist movement that emerged in the 1970s.

The FRSO's component groups generally identified ultraleftism as the U.S. New Communist movement's main error. Merging under the FRSO banner, some of these groups hoped to consolidate the movement's remnants in a single organization and move beyond the sectarianism that marked the previous decade. The FRSO was founded out of a merger between the Proletarian Unity League and the Revolutionary Workers Headquarters in 1985. It then fused with the Organization for Revolutionary Unity in 1986. It later absorbed other groups, including the Amílcar Cabral-Paul Robeson Collective in 1988 and the Socialist Organizing Network in 1994.

Ideology 
The FRSO considers Karl Marx, Friedrich Engels, Vladimir Lenin, Joseph Stalin, and Mao Zedong the principal theorists of Marxism–Leninism. It recognizes Cuba, North Korea, Vietnam, Laos, and China as socialist countries. It also maintains close relations with the Workers Party of Belgium (WPB), participating annually in the WPB's International Communist Seminar. It was one of two U.S.-based groups to attend in 2006, along with the Workers World Party. It vocally supports the Communist Party of the Philippines and the Popular Front for the Liberation of Palestine (PFLP). Its continued solidarity with the national liberation movements in Colombia, the Philippines and Palestine in particular remain a defining feature of the organization since the 1999 split.

One of the FRSO's most distinguishing characteristics on the U.S. socialist left is its approach to the national question. Drawing from the line of the CPUSA from 1928 to 1958, the FRSO considers African Americans in the Black Belt South an oppressed nation. Additionally, it views Chicanos in the Southwest and Hawaii as oppressed nations within the borders of the United States. FRSO supports independence for Puerto Rico, as well as the Virgin Islands, American Samoa, Palau, Guam, the Marshall Islands, and the Northern Mariana Islands.

The organization opposes U.S. intervention in the Russo-Ukrainian War.

Political work in the 1980s 
In the 1980s, members of the FRSO and its predecessor organizations worked to build the Rainbow Coalition, and supported Jesse Jackson for president in 1984 and 1988. They also worked on Harold Washington's successful campaigns for mayor of Chicago in 1983 and 1987.

In the 1980s, the FRSO also played an important role in the U.S. student movement, leading the Progressive Student Network (PSN), a national, multi-issue, progressive student activist organization.

From the 1980s through the mid-1990s, the FRSO published Forward Motion, a magazine formerly published by the Proletarian Unity League.

FRSO in the 1990s 
In 1994 the Socialist Organizing Network (SON) merged into the FRSO. The SON was formed out of the dissolution of the League of Revolutionary Struggle in the late 1980s, and included those who had been in LRS who still considered themselves Marxists (most of the leadership had rejected Marxism when they disbanded the LRS).

The merger of the FRSO and the SON technically marked the creation of a new organization, as at the time it was seen as a merger of two equal organizations into something new, rather than the FRSO's incorporation of the SON. The merged organization was briefly called "Freedom Road/Socialist Organizing Network", including both organizations' names, with the possibility that it would adopt an entirely new name. A new name never came to fruition, so the name reverted to "Freedom Road Socialist Organization". But the 1994 FRSO Congress, at which the FRSO/SON merger was formalized, was called the First Congress of FRSO/SON.

The FRSO published the SON's periodical Moving Forward for a short period after the merger. It continued to sporadically publish Forward Motion during the 1990s. In 1998, the FRSO's Chicago District and Minnesota/Madison, Wisconsin District began to publish a Midwest regional newspaper called Fight Back! News.

The FRSO played a role in the anti-war movement that emerged in 1990 in opposition to the Gulf War. It also helped build the reproductive rights/abortion rights movement in this period, including the massive 1989 demonstration in Washington, D.C.

Ideological Divisions Emerge 
In response to the fall of Eastern European governments, the Tiananmen Square protests of 1989, and the fall of the Soviet Union in 1991, two distinct positions began to emerge within the FRSO on how to assess socialist countries. One saw the events of 1989–1991 as indicative of a deep crisis in Marxism that required what they called 'Left Refoundation'. The other continued to assess the experience of socialist countries as essentially positive, and saw their defeats as the result of revisionism rather than a crisis of Marxism. This side continued to identify itself with Marxism Leninism.

At the organization's 1991 Congress, a document giving the FRSO's official position, "On the Crisis of Socialism", was adopted, which expressed a pessimistic view of actually existing socialism.

In this context, Mick Kelly, a leading member of the FRSO, wrote Continuing the Revolution is Not a Dinner Party in 1989, which argued that the defeat of the Tiananmen Square protests marked an important defeat for counter-revolution and capitalist restoration in socialist countries and prevented the overthrow of socialism in China. To this day, Kelly's paper encapsulates the FRSO's basic line on the People's Republic of China, which it considers a socialist country.

The internal ideological division continued to grow throughout the 1990s.

The 1999 split 
In 1999, the FRSO split into two groups, each retaining the name and considering itself the only legitimate FRSO for several years.

The two groups split principally over a proposal brought forward by a section of FRSO's membership that argued that the organization should adopt a strategy of "Left Refoundation". The Left Refoundation advocates saw Marxism as in deep crisis after the dissolution of the Soviet Union and the overthrow of socialism in Eastern Europe and other regions. Their strategy received its clearest expression in a document called Theses on Left Refoundation, which outlined their views on the "crisis of socialism" and called for the construction of a "party of the dispossessed" based on "uniting in struggle with other forces in the progressive social movements." Their proposal prioritized establishing a "left-pole" in more mainstream liberal, left-wing and progressive political organizations rather than continuing to build a new communist party in the United States. The document expressed general pessimism about the remaining socialist countries and the prospect of socialist revolution in the U.S., looking instead to left-wing social-democratic formations for inspiration like the Workers Party (Brazil).

At a December 1998 meeting of the National Executive Committee (NEC) of the FRSO, three Left Refoundation advocates presented their strategy as a proposal to the NEC. The proposal, "the longest single item at the December NEC meeting," called for a four-month "organization-wide discussion of party-building" along the lines of the Left Refoundation strategy outlined in the initial document.

By a unanimous vote, the NEC rejected the Left Refoundation advocates' call for a four-month organization-wide discussion. In a written response published internally to members of the FRSO in January 1999, the NEC cited concerns that such a discussion would detract from ongoing mass organizing work. Beyond these immediate practical impacts, though, the NEC saw the particular proposals as effectively overturning the strategic and tactical decisions reached at the FRSO's Second Congress in 1997. As a democratic centralist organization, the FRSO, according to the statement, "requires the common application of lines collectively decided on and the collective evaluation and adjustment of those lines based on their implementation in practice."

The NEC's written response took a measured tone, but represented a serious defeat of the Left Refoundation position. The majority position generally upheld Marxist Leninism and wanted to continue building a revolutionary communist party, even in disadvantageous circumstances. The Marxist–Leninist group considered Left Refoundation an ideological expression of "a right wing section of our organization" that had "adopted the standpoint of social-democracy and anti-communism, and insisted that FRSO pursue this strategy."

Sometime in 1999, the Left Refoundation faction regrouped and joined with sympathetic, wavering NEC members in calling for an organization-wide meeting to adopt their proposal anyway. This meeting was not called as a congress in accordance with the FRSO's democratic centralist structure, in which the congress is the highest decision-making body and tasked with approving changes in line and strategy. At the meeting, "the National Executive Committee was almost evenly divided" on the question, with the Marxist–Leninist NEC members denouncing the move as "this road to liquidation and disintegration." A split took place during the meeting between the Marxist–Leninist group and the Left Refoundation group, which formally separated from one another.

The Marxist-Leninists maintained the Left Refoundation project was "contrary to the line, strategy, and plans we adopted at our past Congress which is the highest decision making body of our organization" and "contrary to Marxism and democratic centralism." According to a statement the FRSO released after the split, the Marxist-Leninists summed up the meeting as the illegitimate outcome of "another section of our leadership refus[ing] to struggle for the decisions adopted at our past Congress, and instead pledged FRSO support for this left refoundation strategy. There was a real danger that Freedom Road would cease to be Freedom Road."

Although each faction claimed the name "Freedom Road Socialist Organization" and refused to recognize the other for several years, the Left Refoundation group officially changed its name to "FRSO/OSCL" by 2006, combining the English and Spanish acronym of the organization's name, and then to Liberation Road.

After the split in the 2000s 

The FRSO continues to explicitly uphold Marxism–Leninism. It operates according to democratic centralism and has an anti-revisionist political line toward the world communist movement. The FRSO actively maintains friendly relations with many Marxist–Leninist parties and organizations around the world, and participated in the annual International Communist Seminar.

FRSO Congresses in the 2000s 
FRSO has held post-split organizational Congresses in 2001, 2004, 2007, 2010, 2014, 2018 and in 2022.

The Third Congress of the FRSO was in 2001, two years after the split. Delegates adopted a new version of the main Unity Statement, which explicitly identified Marxism–Leninism as the organization's political ideology. Previous iterations of the FRSO Unity Statement had not mentioned Marxism–Leninism by name, owing to the ideological divisions within the organization at the time.

At the Fourth Congress in 2004, the FRSO produced a new unity statement laying out its line the national question in the U.S. In a statement released after the congress, the organization called this statement "a concluding step in placing our organization on a Marxist–Leninist basis", in contrast to the social-democratic-leaning ideologies embraced by the Left Refoundation group.

In 2007, the FRSO held its Fifth Congress, which saw the adoption of the first part of the FRSO's organizational program. This document, "Class in the U.S. and Our Strategy for Revolution", outlines the various classes in the United States and the FRSO's general strategy for revolution. Unlike most communist parties and organizations, the FRSO has historically not had a political program. This document was released after the congress with the intention of integrating it into the final FRSO program upon its completion.

The Fifth Congress also adopted and released "The Movement Against the War in Iraq: A New Period and Our Tasks", a document covering FRSO's approach to the antiwar movement under the George W. Bush administration and the U.S. occupation of Iraq.

FRSO in the 2010s 
In the 2010s, the FRSO experienced sizable growth, fueled in large part by an influx of young workers and student activists. Over the decade, the organization cultivated a sustained mass organizing presence in the labor movement and the Black freedom movement, and further developed its presence in the student movement, particularly the SDS. The FRSO expanded geographically beyond its longtime Midwestern stronghold, establishing new districts in the South and southwest.

All this growth took place in spite of a series of raids by the FBI on the FRSO and other leading antiwar activists at the start of the decade. The FRSO emerged from the 2010s as a leading force for victims of state repression, having founded the committee to Stop FBI Repression and played a leading role in the campaign to free Palestinian activist Rasmea Odeh after her arrest in 2014.

2010 FBI raids on the FRSO 
On September 24, 2010, over 70 FBI agents simultaneously raided homes and served subpoenas to prominent antiwar and international solidarity activists in Minneapolis, Chicago, and Grand Rapids, Michigan. The agents seized computers, books, written material, cell phones, family portraits, clothing and other items deemed political. FBI agents also visited and attempted to question activists in Milwaukee; Durham, North Carolina; and San Jose, California. The search warrants and subpoenas indicated that the FBI was looking for evidence related to the "material support of terrorism".

In the process of raiding an activist's home, FBI agents accidentally left behind a file of secret FBI documents showing that the raids were aimed at people who were or were suspected of being members of the FRSO. The documents revealed a series of questions agents asked activists about their involvement in the FRSO and their international solidarity work related to Colombia and Palestine.

On January 12, 2011, members of the newly formed Committee to Stop FBI Repression held a press conference in Minnesota revealing that the FBI had placed an informant inside the FRSO to gather information before the raids.

On February 26, 2014, a federal judge unsealed the extensive documents the FBI collected during its nearly three-year surveillance of the FRSO. The documents revealed that the FBI placed an informant around and eventually inside the FRSO during and after the 2008 protests at the Republican National Convention in St. Paul. The informant, Karen Sullivan, attempted to craft a case that the FRSO was materially supporting the FARC and the PFLP with its antiwar and international solidarity activism.

To date, no charges have been brought against either members of the FRSO or non-FRSO-aligned defendants.

Congresses in the 2010s  
In the 2010s, the FRSO held three organizational congresses, in 2010, 2014 and 2018.

The Sixth Congress, in mid-2010, took place before the FBI raids that year. It produced a statement from the organization, a main political report, and seven resolutions on different areas of struggle, including the immigrant rights movement. A statement released after the Congress emphasized both unprecedented growth in membership and its developing work in the U.S. labor movement, the student movement and the movements of oppressed nationalities.

In 2014, the FRSO held its Seventh Congress, which it called "in and of itself a victory." In a statement afterward, the FRSO noted that the Seventh Congress came "four years after the FBI raids and grand jury subpoenas charging activists, including members of the FRSO, with material support for terrorism. It took some backbone to withstand this U.S. government attack. We were able to fend off the worst of the attacks, with more than a little help from our friends." At the congress, delegates approved three reports outlining the FRSO's line on the domestic political situation in the U.S., the international situation and the economy. The same statement summed up the congress as "a great success, in terms of defining current conditions, our growing capacity to lead and influence people’s movements, deepening our understanding of Marxism-Leninism, and recruiting to and building the FRSO."

The Eighth Congress, in May 2018, approved three resolutions on the domestic political, international and economic situation, which "provide a basis for understanding basic conditions, the forces in motion in society, as well as the strengths and weaknesses of the movements for social change and revolution." Sixteen months into Donald Trump's presidency, the FRSO saw the period as "very dynamic and fluid", marked by "major attacks and widespread, large-scale fightbacks...As communists, we must lead campaigns that attempt to win all that can be won. Fortune favors the brave and bold."

Left Refoundation split renamed "Liberation Road"

In April 2019, the Left Refoundation group announced that it was changing its name to "Liberation Road". Liberation Road explained its name change in a statement released on its website as "pragmatic—motivated by the need to differentiate ourselves from the splinter group who continue to operate under our old name", referring to the present-day FRSO. It also reiterated its ideological commitment to "Left Refoundation".

FRSO in the 2020s 
FRSO took an active role in the 2020-2022 United States racial justice protests after the murder of George Floyd. It celebrated the conviction of Derek Chauvin.

FRSO publications 
The FRSO publishes Fight Back! News in print and online and includes a Spanish-language section, Lucha y Resiste.

FRSO has also published various pamphlets and theoretical documents outlining its approach to organizing and its political line, which are available on its website. For instance, in 2009 it published The Immigrant Rights Movement and the Struggle for Full Equality, a pamphlet that outlines a class analysis of the immigrant rights movement in relation to the Chicano national movement in the Aztlan.

In 2019 FRSO published Class Struggle on the Shop Floor: Strategy for a New Generation of Socialists in the United States, which outlines core principles of labor organizing like class struggle unionism and the militant minority. The pamphlet draws from the ideas William Z. Foster and other early Communist Party USA labor leaders, and argues that the growing movement of socialists must root itself in the working class, particularly the rank-and-file of the union movement.

In 2021, FRSO published its first book, Marxist-Leninist Perspectives on Black Liberation and Socialism by Frank Chapman. The book is about the historic relationship between the struggle for Black Liberation and the struggle for socialism in the United States.

References

External links
Freedom Road Socialist Organization

Liberation Road (Splinter formerly also claiming the name Freedom Road Socialist Organization)

Freedom Road Socialist Organization at the Encyclopedia of Anti-Revisionism Online

Anti-imperialist organizations
Anti-racist organizations in the United States
Anti-revisionist organizations
Far-left politics in the United States
Political parties established in 1985
1985 establishments in the United States
Marxist–Leninist parties in the United States
Communist organizations in the United States